This is a list of Estonian television related events from 1960.

Events
 26 January – first program was broadcast from Kohtla-Järve television mast (135 m).

Debuts

Television shows

Ending this year

Births

Deaths

See also
 1960 in Estonia

References

1960s in Estonian television